Franco Rodrigo Fragapane (born 6 February 1993) is an Argentine professional footballer who plays as a winger for Major League Soccer club Minnesota United.

Club career
Born in Las Heras, Mendoza, Fragapane joined Boca Juniors' youth setup in 2005, aged 12, after impressing in a trial. He played his first match as a professional on 1 March 2012, coming on as a late substitute in a 2–0 home success over Central Córdoba de Rosario, for the season's Copa Argentina.

Fragapane played regularly with the reserve side during the following seasons, and made his Primera División debut on 8 December 2013, again from the bench in a 1–1 home draw against Gimnasia La Plata. He appeared in two further matches during the campaign, with Boca finishing second overall.

On 12 July 2014 Fragapane moved abroad for the first time in his career, joining Spanish Segunda División B side Elche CF Ilicitano on loan, with a buyout clause. On 6 December he made his debut with the main squad, replacing Coro in a 0–2 La Liga home loss against Atlético Madrid.

On 7 August 2015 Fragapane joined another reserve team, Celta de Vigo B on loan for one year.

On 1 July 2021, Fragapane was named as the player who allegedly directed a racial slur towards Portland Timbers player Diego Chará during a game on 26 June 2021. MLS conducted an internal investigation and could not confirm or refute the allegation took place.

International career
Fragapane was one of the 22-man selected for 2011 Pan American Games. He appeared five times during the tournament, scoring once (against Costa Rica on 21 October 2011).

References

External links

1993 births
Living people
Sportspeople from Mendoza Province
Argentine footballers
Association football forwards
Argentine Primera División players
Boca Juniors footballers
Arsenal de Sarandí footballers
La Liga players
Segunda División B players
Elche CF Ilicitano footballers
Elche CF players
Celta de Vigo B players
Unión de Santa Fe footballers
Talleres de Córdoba footballers
Fortaleza Esporte Clube players
Minnesota United FC players
Campeonato Brasileiro Série A players
Argentine expatriate footballers
Argentine expatriate sportspeople in Spain
Argentine expatriate sportspeople in the United States
Expatriate footballers in Spain
Argentine expatriates in Brazil
Expatriate footballers in Brazil
Expatriate soccer players in the United States
Pan American Games medalists in football
Pan American Games silver medalists for Argentina
Footballers at the 2011 Pan American Games
Medalists at the 2011 Pan American Games
Major League Soccer players